Adephagia in Greek mythology was the goddess and personification of gluttony.

Mythology 
Adephagia was only mentioned in one source, as having a temple on the island of Sicily, at which she was worshipped alongside Demeter."It is said also that there is a temple in Sicily dedicated to Gluttony (Adephagia), and an image of Ceres Sitos (Demeter, the corn-giver)."

Notes

References 

 Claudius Aelianus, Varia Historia translated by Thomas Stanley (d.1700) edition of 1665. Online version at the Topos Text Project.
 Claudius Aelianus, Claudii Aeliani de natura animalium libri xvii, varia historia, epistolae, fragmenta, Vol 2. Rudolf Hercher. In Aedibus B.G. Teubneri. Lipsiae. 1866. Greek text available at the Perseus Digital Library.

Further reading 
 David Whitehead, Observations on Adephagia (in Rheinisches Museum. 145, 2002 P 175-186) 

Greek goddesses
Personifications in Greek mythology